Çiyni (also, Chiyni) is a village and municipality in the Ujar Rayon of Azerbaijan.

References 

Populated places in Ujar District